The P.E.O. Sisterhood (Philanthropic Educational Organization) is a U.S.-based international women's organization of about 230,000 members, with a primary focus on providing educational opportunities for female students worldwide. The Sisterhood is headquartered in Des Moines, Iowa, with chapters throughout the United States and Canada. Among other projects, it owns and supports Cottey College, an independent college for women in Nevada, Missouri.

History
The Sisterhood was founded on January 21, 1869, as a seven-member sorority at Iowa Wesleyan University in Mount Pleasant, Iowa. It was the second sorority to be founded in the U.S., after I. C. Sorosis (now known as Pi Beta Phi) in Monmouth, Illinois in April 1867. The founding members were Mary Allen [Stafford] (1848–1927), Ella Stewart (1848–94), Alice Bird Babb (1850–1926), Hattie Briggs [Bousquet] (1849–77), Franc Roads [Elliott] (1852–1924), Alice Virginia Coffin (1848–88), and Suela Pearson [Penfield] (1851–1920). The sisterhood was founded after only some of the seven girls were invited to join a chapter of I. C. Sorosis organized in Mount Pleasant a month earlier, and they would not join without the others.

The organization was originally rooted in the philosophy and institutions of the Methodist Church, which actively promoted women's rights and education in America during the 19th century. 

Further chapters were founded, and in 1883 local chapters of the P.E.O. founded a "Supreme Chapter" to coordinate the Sisterhood on a national level. The first International chapter (i.e. outside the United States) was established in Vancouver, British Columbia, Canada in 1911.

Although P.E.O. began as a collegiate sorority at Iowa Wesleyan, tensions developed between that original chapter and the wider body. In 1902 the Iowa Wesleyan chapter left P.E.O., to be reconstituted as the second chapter of Alpha Xi Delta (founded in 1893 at Lombard College, Illinois). Since then, P.E.O. has been essentially a community-based organization.

Name
For much of its history, the meaning of "P.E.O." in the organization's name was a closely guarded secret and was never made public. In 1924, it was said that "These letters are 'mystic'. None save the initiated know their meaning." The organization's avoidance of publicity, and the secrecy of its name, caused it to be regarded as a "secret society". 

In 2005, the Sisterhood unveiled a new logo and an "It's OK to Talk About P.E.O." campaign, which sought to raise the public profile of the organization while nonetheless maintaining its traditions of secrecy. In 2008, it revised its website to indicate that "P.E.O." now publicly stands for "Philanthropic Educational Organization". However, the Sisterhood acknowledges that "P.E.O." originally had a different meaning that continues to be "reserved for members only", and so the public meaning is not the only one.

Ritual and symbolism 

Membership in P.E.O. is by invitation but is not secret. Meetings for members are, however, highly guarded and a secret password must be used to prove membership. They are opened with prayers and with inspirational readings chosen by members, but P.E.O. meetings and activities do not require any particular religion or religious practice, except for a belief in God. Meetings follow a structured agenda, but do not involve religious rites, and do not meet any formal definition of "ritualistic".

At her initiation, every member receives a P.E.O. emblem, a five-pointed star. Members are encouraged to wear their emblems on January 21, Founders' Day. The emblem is lent to the individual for as long as she remains an active member of a chapter. On her death, it may be buried with her if she has requested this in writing: otherwise, it is to be returned to her chapter or to the P.E.O. Executive.

The P.E.O. official flower is the marguerite daisy.

Activities
P.E.O.'s core mission is to promote educational opportunities for women. It has six philanthropic projects, which include Cottey College, an independent, liberal arts and sciences college for women. Five programs provide assistance to women for higher education: P.E.O. Educational Loan Fund, P.E.O. International Peace Scholarship Fund, P.E.O. Program for Continuing Education, P.E.O. Scholar Awards, and P.E.O. STAR Scholarship.

As of April 2022, The P.E.O. Sisterhood is a nonprofit organization that has helped more than 119,000 women pursue educational goals by providing over $398 million* in educational assistance, making a difference in women’s lives through six philanthropies and a foundation:  

 P.E.O. Educational Loan Fund (ELF) — A revolving loan fund established in 1907 to lend money to qualified women students to assist them in securing a higher education. Has loaned $235.9 million.

 P.E.O. International Peace Scholarship (IPS) — A fund established in 1949 to provide scholarships for international women students to pursue graduate study in the U.S. and Canada. Has provided $45.4 million in scholarships.

 P.E.O. Program for Continuing Education (PCE) — Established in 1973 to provide need-based grants to women in the U.S. and Canada whose education has been interrupted and who find it necessary to return to school to support themselves and/or their families. Has given $67.6 million in grants.

 P.E.O. Scholar Awards (PSA) — Established in 1991 to provide substantial merit-based awards for women of the U.S. and Canada who are pursuing a doctoral-level degree at an accredited college or university. Has awarded $32.1 million in scholarships.

 P.E.O. STAR Scholarship (STAR) — Established in 2009 to provide scholarships for exceptional women in their final year of high school to attend an accredited postsecondary educational institution in the U.S. or Canada in the next academic year. Has given $17.2 million in scholarships.

 Cottey College — A nationally ranked, fully accredited, independent, liberal arts/sciences college for women located in Nevada, Missouri, has been owned/supported by P.E.O. since 1927 and offers baccalaureate and associate degrees in a variety of majors. Cottey College, a debt-free institution, welcomes women from around the world.

Membership 
In 1966 the Sisterhood had 130,000 members. At that time membership was open to women over 18, who believed in God and had lived at their present address for a least a year. It was said to appeal to "Protestant women of some social standing and college education".

Although always officially nonsectarian, P.E.O. has evolved over recent generations into a deliberately diverse, community-based organization with nearly 6,000 chapters and some 230,000 members. It has chapters in each of the 50 United States, District of Columbia and in six Canadian provinces. It now aims to serve women worldwide, and to welcome women of all races, religions and backgrounds. It emphasizes that it does "not discriminate against any woman based on age, ethnicity, religion or education. The Sisterhood is based on friendship and mutual respect. P.E.O. is not political nor is it a political action group."

Notable members
 Laura Chenoweth Butz
 Saidie Orr Dunbar
 Isabel H. Ellis
 Iris Pavey Gilmore
 Kate Wetzel Jameson
 Jeanette Lawrence
 Ona F. Meens
 Sara E. Morse
 Edith Allen Phelps
 Effie Hoffman Rogers
 Rachel Irene Seibert

Founders' portraits
In the 1920s, the P.E.O. commissioned a set of portraits in oil of its seven founders from Marion Dunlap Harper. The paintings were unveiled in P.E.O. Memorial Hall in Mount Pleasant on September 23, 1929. They are composites sourced from a collection of sketches, portraits and photographs: those of Alice Coffin and Franc Roads are based on photographs taken at the same studio, and they are wearing the same cape.

References

Sources

External links

Cottey College

1869 establishments in the United States
International women's organizations
Organizations established in 1869
Secret societies in Canada
Secret societies in the United States
Service organizations based in the United States
Women's clubs in the United States
Women's organizations based in Canada
Women's organizations based in the United States